Ramtek is a city and municipal council in Nagpur district of Maharashtra, India.

History
Ramtek hosts the historic temple of Rama. It is believed that Ramtek was the place where Rama, the Hindu god, rested while he was in exile, Hence it is named Ramtek. According to Hindu history the ashram of the Hindu sage Agastya was situated close to Ramtek. The present temple was built by Raghuji Bhonsale, the Maratha ruler of Nagpur in 18th century after his victory over fort of Deogarh in Chindwara.

This place is also related to the Sanskrit poet Kalidasa. It is believed that Kalidasa wrote Meghadūta in the hills of Ramtek.

Ramtek is the birthplace the second Sarsanghchalak (supreme leader) of Rashtriya Swayamsewak Sangh, Madhav Sadashiv Golwalkar.

Jain Temple 

Ramtek is also known for its ancient Jain temple with various ancient statues of Jain Tirthankara. The main idol of Shantinatha, the sixteenth Tirthankar has a legend associated with it.

It became more popular when one of the leading Digambar Jain Acharyas, Acharya Vidyasagar visited and stayed with his sangh in Ramtek in 1993, 94, 2008, 2013 and 2017 for the four months of chaturmas during the rainy season. With his inspiration, a big Jain temple has been constructed.

The place was ruled by Gond rulers before being captured by the Bhonsale rulers of Nagpur in the eighteenth century.

Education
Ramtek has an engineering college KITS which comes under Rashtrasant Tukadoji Maharaj Nagpur University, Nagpur as also the Kavikulaguru Kalidas Sanskrit University. The college Shri Narendra Tidke College of Arts and Commerce is also located in Ramtek.

Geography
  
It has an average elevation of 345 metres (1131 feet). It is located at a distance of around 50 km from Nagpur. Khindasi lake is one of the important tourist attractions at Ramtek.

Demographics
 India census, Ramtek had a population of 22,517. Males constitute 51% of the population and females 49%. Ramtek has an average literacy rate of 75%, higher than the national average of 59.5%: male literacy is 82%, and female literacy is 68%. In Ramtek, 12% of the population is under 6 years of age.

See also
Kachurwahi

References

Cities and towns in Nagpur district
Nagpur district
Talukas in Maharashtra
Places in the Ramayana